Accessibility apps are mobile apps that increase the accessibility of a device for individuals with disabilities. Accessibility apps are applications that increase the accessibility of a device or technology for individuals with disabilities. Applications, also known as, application software, are programs that are designed for end users to be able to perform specific tasks. There are many different types of apps, some examples include, word processors, web browsers, media players, console games, photo editors, accounting applications and flight simulators. Accessibility in general refers to making the design of products and environment more accommodating to those with disabilities. Accessibility apps can also include making a current version of software or hardware more accessible by adding features. Accessibility apps main aim is to remove any barriers to technological goods and services, making the app available to any group of society to use. A basic example is that a person who experiences vision impairments is able to access technology through enabling voice recognition and text-to-speech software. Accessibility apps are closely related to assistive technology.

History of apps 

The term apps as society knows it is a relatively new term. Strain (2015) mentions that Founder of Apple, Steve Jobs, is responsible for the way society thinks of mobile apps. In 1983, Jobs made a speech at a technology conference in Aspen, US where he predicted the "evolution of a new digital distribution system". Jobs described this system as similar to a record store where it will be possible in the future to download software over phone lines. The term society knows as apps was a further development from early PDAs that held the game Snake on the Nokia 6110 phone. PDAs stands for personal digital assistant and is a small handheld computer that is capable of providing emails and internet access. The Apple App store was launched on 10 July 2008 with 500 apps. The Google Play Store, which was originally known as the Android Market was launched on 22 October 2008. It is interesting to note that the iPhone 3G was released just a day after the App Store opened. This was the first iPhone that was able to connect to 3G. Today, as of 2020 there is 2.2 million apps available to download on the Apple App store. Matthew Panzarino, co-editor of TechCrunch, believes that there are three phases of app history in mobile technology. Firstly, the initial gaming and utilities apps available on mobiles. This was seen in early PDAs and the first-generation iPhone. Secondly, apps that were focused on grabbing the user's attention and dominating the mobile home screen. Thirdly, today's phase in which apps are service layers, purpose built and utilise technology such as hardware sensors, location, history of use, and predictive computation. Today in 2021 apps are not only present in technology such as mobiles and computers but also in wearable technology such as watches.

History of accessible technology 
Examples of accessible technology date back to the 1800s. In 1808 Pellegrino Turri built one of the first typewriters to help a blind friend write. In 1916 Harvey Fletcher built the Western Electric Model 2A hearing aid. In 1934 the first issue of talking books was released so that blind people could listen to books. In 1995 Microsoft built accessibility features into Windows 95 instead of previously having to purchase an accessibility add-on.

Need 
In recent years there has been a push from society for app developers to increase accessibility.  Fifteen percent of the world's population, experience some form of disability, equivalent to one billion people. Thus, accessibility apps are incredibly relevant in today's society. The main driver behind accessibility apps stems from society's increasing need for interconnectedness and growing demand for technology. In recent years there has been improvement in making technology more accessible for those with disability. However, the 2018 Australian Human Rights Commission states that more measures need to be put in place in order to achieve equal access and for all groups of society to reap the benefits of today's digitally connected society. Pick and Azari (2008) highlight the importance of educating society about the progress but also the future of accessibility and technology.

Accessibility features in iPhones and computers 
People who experience disabilities are able to increase the accessibility of technology they already own by enabling specific features. For example, within the settings app on iPhones, there are several features that increase accessibility such as 'Assistive Touch', 'Classic Invert Colours', 'Colour Filters' and 'Magnifier'. These adjustments found in iPhone settings have the ability to improve accessibility for people who experience disabilities such as motor impairments, visual impairments, colour blindness, and insensitivities. Hence, it is not just independent apps but also features within software that are able to increase accessibility for individuals.

Low-level coding—extremely complex yet incredibly customizable. This software creation process is expensive and time-consuming, but you can do just about everything with it.

Accessibility should be highly prioritized by smartphone makers to give disabled people easy access to communicate with their device. In recent years, progress are being made and more tools are constantly being developed to aid accessibility in mobile devices. Especially the Apple iPhones.

Benefits 
New technology, such as accessibility apps provide a platform to increase accessibility to services for people with disability. The lower costs of services made available through new technologies can improve equality amongst groups with disability.

The benefits of new technology go beyond accessibility apps. Teachers have found that new technology has made learning material more accessible to students, and in turn, increased the number of students able to enrol in university courses.

Apps have been developed to allow persons with disability to control their household and complete daily tasks through voice recognition software. Additionally, apps have been created that allow a person to take a photo of their surroundings and their phone will describe the photo. For example, a person who is vision impaired can go to a supermarket, take a photo of a product, and the app will name the product. Alternatively, a person can take a photo of another person and the app will describe the person's emotions audibly.

People who live with disabilities face difficulties every day and in situations most people take for granted. The study (Mayordomo-Martinez et al., 2019) explains how an accessibility app functions and what apps need to consist of in order to achieve accessibility. The study uses 'Access Earth' as a prime example of an app that has made the outside environment more accessible to people. The app achieves this by locating and sharing facilities such as parking, bathrooms, and buildings in a free global community. Hence, this accessibility app has the ability to improve living conditions and individuals' livelihoods. Furthermore, there are also apps, such as 'AccessNow' that enhance accessibility by creating global communities for members to share and search for accessibility information.

A recent study (Yu, Parmanto, Dicianno, & Pramana, 2015) looked at the accessibility of mental health self-care app, for individuals and its accessibility options for people with Spina Bifida. All of the participants in the study could use the app without assistance and stated they would use the app again in the future. However, there were complications in regards to accessibility of the app. Participants noted that due to each of their unique disabilities, there was a need for the app to allow personalisation by the user in order to modify content appearance such as the size and colour of text.

Case study 
This case study is an example of how new technologies can create barriers for people with disability if accessibility is not considered when designing technology. The Commonwealth Bank Eftpos system that was released in 2017 was an example of a poorly executed app that did not include accessibility features. The bank's new system was a tablet with no physical buttons or tactile keys, unlike other previous Eftpos machines. As such, the system was heavily criticised by the disabled community because of the touchscreen-only system which forced the blind and visually impaired to either give out their credit card pins when paying or to not go through with the payment. Stores with such machines were no longer accessible to people who are blind or visually impaired. Such people were forced to resort to family members to complete their weekly grocery shop because the individual had stopped going to retailers with these machines. Ultimately, this app which was created without the consideration of the disabled community meant that individuals and small businesses who were both using the app suffered as a result of payments being terminated.

A few years later, in 2019, Commonwealth Bank of Australia agreed to introduce a software upgrade to the Eftpos machine to make it more accessible for the visually impaired. This was a result of a discrimination case brought against the bank and several other campaigns from vision-impaired Australians. CBA recognised its wrongdoing and introduced several actions to mend its mistakes. Firstly, they released upgrades to the software to include easier activation of the accessibility feature and other enhancements. Secondly, the bank added training available to merchants so they could understand how to use and implement the accessibility features to customers. Finally, CBA also created a video for card holders demonstrating how they can activate the accessibility features and use them when purchasing an item in store. CBA has stated that it is now committed to ensuring that accessibility will be a key factor and consideration behind further product development.

Discriminative aspects of technology 

Technology can contain discriminatory aspects that can negatively affect individuals. Technology has the ability to violate human rights such as the right to privacy, security, safety, and the right to non-discrimination and equal treatment.

New technology poses a threat to society's right to privacy. New technology has the ability to personalise products and services by altering preferences and characteristics relevant to the user. This process is possible because of the collection, storage, use and transfer of the user's personal information. Data collection of user's personal information can be used to influence search engine results, direct marketing, and opens up the possibility of mass surveillance by the government and private sector. For this reason, people are concerned with their online privacy.

New technology has the ability to enhance but also threaten personal safety and security. For example, new technology such as drones can be used to identify threats to society or be deployed as weapons. Additionally, there is a form of technology that allows people who have diabetes to monitor their blood glucose and administers insulin when required. However, this same technology poses a threat to individuals because it enables a platform for cybercrime where abuse, exploitation, intimidation and threatening conduct becomes possible.

New technology poses a threat to the right to non-discrimination and equal treatment. Economic inequality can become apparent when a particular labor force is replaced by robotics. Although, technology can also reduce inequality, for instance, sustainable energy technologies can improve the livelihoods of those living in developing nations. The access to technological innovations can vary greatly depending on how economically, socially, and physically marginalised a group is.

New technology is becoming a part of everyday life whether it is shopping, transport, or accessing government services. For this reason, it is important that all groups of society have equal access to technology. Technology can discriminate against elderly people. For example, older people may have difficulty accessing online government services or could be at risk of personal health data being exploited. Children and young people can also be discriminated against by technology through the use of social platforms. People with disability are a group that are especially exposed to the discriminating aspects of technology. Currently, people with disability experience a lower digital inclusion rate which means they are unable to access the same amount of digital platforms as those who do not have disability. Concerns remain surrounding affordability, lack of access to equipment, lack of awareness surrounding disability-specific options, insufficient touchscreen technology for people who have vision impairments, and that inaccessible communication technologies can impose employment discrimination on those with disability.

There are several frameworks and models in place on a global perspective to protect people with disability from discrimination aspects of technology. For example, in Australia, The Convention on the Rights of Persons with Disabilities (CRPD) expects that all private sector companies and government bodies release information that is accessible to all groups of society. The Australian Government is required to test the experience of users with disability of its services to ensure that information is accessible. In comparison, the US is known to have one of the most comprehensive legal frameworks to ensure online equality. However, this set of laws are not properly enforced and thus people with disability still lack equal online access.

Apps need to be designed with 'universality' and 'inclusivity' in mind. App developers need to create apps that are accessible and inclusive to all groups of people including those with disability and specialised needs.

References 

 Accessibility
Disability studies